Scandal in a Small Town is a 1988 television film directed by Anthony Page and starring Raquel Welch.

Plot

Leda Beth Vincent lives in the small town of Shiloh.  Her daughter Julie is a high school student who experiences anti-Semitic propaganda in her history class.  Leda thinks this is unacceptable and tries to fight the Board of Education.  She is forced to take them and the teacher responsible to court.

Cast of characters
Raquel Welch as Leda Beth Vincent
Christa Denton as Julie Vincent
Frances Lee McCain as Gwendolyn McLeod
Robin Gammell as Professor Paul Martin
Peter Van Norden as Lawyer
Ronny Cox as a Professor
Mickey Jones as Glenn
Peter Palmer as Scottie
Harold Pruett as Michael

External links

References

1988 films
1988 television films
American television films
Films scored by Mark Snow
Films about the education system in the United States
Films directed by Anthony Page
Propaganda in fiction
Films about antisemitism
1980s English-language films